Tobi may refer to:
 Tobi (given name), a unisex name
 Tobi (island), island in the Palauan state of Hatohobei
 Tobian language, the language of Tobi
 Hatohobei, an island and the southernmost of Palau's sixteen states
 Tobi (month), in the Coptic calendar
 Tobi!, a 2009 television series
 Tobramycin, an antibiotic drug that is sold under the brand name "Tobi"
 Tobi (Naruto), the alias of Obito Uchiha, one of the primary antagonists in the anime and manga series Naruto Shippuden
 ToBI, a standard for transcribing English intonation
 Tobi shokunin or tobi for short; construction workers in Japan
 Tobi trousers, the typical piece of clothing of tobi shokunin
 Texas Oilman's Bass Invitational (TOBI)
 Tobi (1978 film)

See also
 Tobias
 Toby (disambiguation)